Fountain Valley is a suburban city in Orange County, California. The population was 57,047 at the 2020 census.

History

Indigenous 
The Indigenous people of the Fountain Valley area are the Tongva. The closest village to present-day site of the city was the village of Pasbenga. The village was part of a series of villages along what the Spanish would refer to as the Santa Ana River.

Spanish 
Control of the land was subsequently transferred to Mexico upon independence from Spain, and then to the United States as part of the Treaty of Guadalupe Hidalgo.

Talbert
Talbert was a settlement at what is now the intersection of Talbert and Bushard. It was also known as Gospel Swamp by residents.

Thomas B. Talbert was born outside Montecello in Piatt County, Illinois, in 1878. When Talbert was 13, his family moved to Long Beach, California. The Talberts opened a general store and thus the settlement of Talbert was established.

The area was full of farms growing beets that were processed at some of the nation's largest plants at Huntington Beach (Holly Sugar Plant) and at Delhi, now part of southwestern Santa Ana. The post office was established in 1899, with Thomas B. Talbert serving as the first postmaster.

The All-Saints Church is the only structure remaining from that era. The Santa Ana-Huntington Beach line of the Pacific Electric Railway passed through Talbert and opened on July 5, 1909.

Incorporation
The city was incorporated in 1957. The name of Fountain Valley refers to the very high water table in the area at the time the name was chosen, and the many corresponding artesian wells in the area. Early settlers constructed drainage canals to make the land usable for agriculture, which remained the dominant use of land until the 1960s, when construction of large housing tracts accelerated. The first mayor of Fountain Valley was James Kanno, who with this appointment became one of the first Japanese-American mayors of a mainland United States city.

After the Fall of Saigon in 1975, there was a large influx of Vietnamese refugees settling in Fountain Valley, especially in the late 1970s and throughout the 1980s, forming a large percentage of Asian Americans in the city.

Geography
The city is located southwest and northeast of the San Diego Freeway (Interstate 405), which diagonally bisects the city, and is surrounded by Huntington Beach on the south and west, Westminster and Garden Grove on the north, Santa Ana on the northeast, and Costa Mesa on the southeast. Its eastern border is the Santa Ana River.

Community amenities 

Fountain Valley is home to Mile Square Regional Park, a  park containing two lakes, three 18-hole golf courses, playing fields, picnic shelters, and a  urban nature area planted with California native plants, a  recreation center with tennis courts, basketball courts, racquetball courts, a gymnasium, and the Kingston Boys & Girls Club; There is also a community center and a  senior center that opened in September 2005. A major redevelopment of the recreation center and city-administered sports fields was completed in early 2009.

Fire protection and emergency medical services are provided by two stations of the Fountain Valley Fire Department.  Law enforcement is provided by the Fountain Valley Police Department. Ambulance service is provided by Care Ambulance Service.

The Orange County Sanitation District's administrative offices and primary plant is located in Fountain Valley next to the Santa Ana River.  The agency is the third-largest sanitation district in the western United States. Fountain Valley is also home to the offices of the Municipal Water District of Orange County, a member of the Metropolitan Water District of Southern California and of the Orange County Water District. The Orange County Water District manages the groundwater basin in central and northern Orange County and operates the Groundwater Replenishment System, the world's largest water purification plant for groundwater recharge.

Fountain Valley has two fully accredited major medical centers: the Fountain Valley Regional Hospital with 400 beds available, and Orange Coast Memorial Medical Center with 230 beds, a medical clinic, and an outpatient medical building.

The city also has 18 churches, one Reform synagogue, a mosque and a public library.

Fountain Valley has its own newspaper, the Fountain Valley View, operated by the Orange County Register.

Economy 
As a suburban city, most of Fountain Valley's residents commute to work in other urban centers. However, in recent years, the city has seen an increase in commercial jobs in the city, with the growth of a commercial center near the Santa Ana River known as the "Southpark" district.

Although the economy of the area was once based mainly on agriculture, the remaining production consists of several fields of strawberries or other small crops, which are gradually being replaced by new office development. Efforts to bolster economic activity are evidenced by the city enacting policies to benefit small businesses, and even going so far as to paint a mural on the facade of a large water treatment building facing the freeway that depicts two shopping bags headlined by the words, "Shop in Fountain Valley."

Fountain Valley is home to the national headquarters of Hyundai Motor America and D-Link Corporation, the global headquarters of memory chip manufacturer Kingston Technology, and the corporate headquarters of Surefire, LLC, maker of military and commercial flashlights.  The Southpark commercial area is also home to offices for companies such as D-Link, Starbucks, Satura and the Orange County Register.  There are also a limited number of light industrial companies in this area.  In addition, Fountain Valley is the location for Noritz, a tankless water heater manufacturer, and the main west coast offices of Ceridian, a professional employer organization.

The increasing commercial growth can be evidenced by the frequent rush-hour traffic bottlenecks on the San Diego (405) Freeway through Fountain Valley.

Top employers
According to the city's 2021 Annual Comprehensive Financial Report, the top employers in the city are:

Arts and culture
Fountain Valley holds an annual Summerfest in June in Mile Square Regional Park. The event features a car show, rides, music, and booths.

Education
There are three high schools, three middle schools, nine elementary schools, one K-12 school, and two K-8 schools. However, some students who live in the city of Fountain Valley actually attend schools in other cities.

Fountain Valley is also home to Coastline Community College.  Community colleges in the area include Orange Coast College and Golden West College, located nearby in the cities of Costa Mesa and Huntington Beach, respectively.

High schools in Huntington Beach Union High School District
Fountain Valley High School
Valley Vista High School

High schools in Garden Grove Unified School District
Los Amigos High School

Middle schools in Fountain Valley School District
Harry C. Fulton Middle School
Kazuo Masuda Middle School: Named for Kazuo Masuda, a soldier who fought in World War II and now is buried in Midway City, California.
Talbert Middle School

Middle schools in Ocean View Middle School District
Vista View Middle School

Elementary schools in Garden Grove Unified School District
Allen Elementary School, a 2011 Blue Ribbon Award winner
Monroe Elementary School
Northcutt Elementary School

Elementary schools in Fountain Valley School District

Courreges Elementary School
Cox Elementary School
Gisler Elementary School
Plavan Elementary School
Tamura Elementary School
Newland Elementary School
Oka Elementary School (located in Huntington Beach)

Private schools
Shoreline Christian School (K-8)

The Lycée International de Los Angeles previously had its Orange County campus in Fountain Valley, but it moved to Orange by 2001.

Transportation 
In addition to the San Diego Freeway, which bisects the city, Fountain Valley is served by several bus lines operated by the Orange County Transportation Authority.  Bus routes 33, 35, 37, 43, 70, 72, 76 and 543 cover the city's major streets.

Most of the major roads are equipped with bicycle lanes, especially around Mile Square Park, which offers wide bike paths along the major streets that mark its boundary. Dedicated bike paths along the Santa Ana River run from the city of Corona to the Pacific Ocean.

Historically, Fountain Valley had Red Car service along the Santa Ana/Huntington Beach Pacific Electric Spur Line. This line ran along Bushard Street. Passenger service started in 1909, ended in 1922, and the lines were torn out in 1930.

Demographics

2010
The 2010 United States Census reported that Fountain Valley had a population of 55,313. The racial makeup of Fountain Valley was 31,225 (56.5%) White (49.2% Non-Hispanic White), 510 (0.9%) African American, 229 (0.4%) Native American, 18,418 (33.3%) Asian, 171 (0.3%) Pacific Islander, 2,445 (4.4%) from other races, and 2,315 (4.2%) from two or more races. Hispanic or Latino of any race were 7,250 persons (13.1%).

The Census reported that 54,876 people (99.2% of the population) lived in households, 257 (0.5%) lived in non-institutionalized group quarters, and 180 (0.3%) were institutionalized.

There were 18,648 households, out of which 6,341 (34.0%) had children under the age of 18 living in them, 11,142 (59.7%) were opposite-sex married couples living together, 2,102 (11.3%) had a female householder with no husband present, 970 (5.2%) had a male householder with no wife present.  There were 646 (3.5%) unmarried opposite-sex partnerships, and 108 (0.6%) same-sex married couples or partnerships. 3,451 households (18.5%) were made up of individuals, and 1,772 (9.5%) had someone living alone who was 65 years of age or older. The average household size was 2.94.  There were 14,214 families (76.2% of all households); the average family size was 3.34.

The population was spread out, with 11,643 people (21.0%) under the age of 18, 4,624 people (8.4%) aged 18 to 24, 13,310 people (24.1%) aged 25 to 44, 16,020 people (29.0%) aged 45 to 64, and 9,716 people (17.6%) who were 65 years of age or older.  The median age was 42.6 years. For every 100 females, there were 94.9 males.  For every 100 females age 18 and over, there were 92.2 males.

The homeowner vacancy rate was 0.8%; the rental vacancy rate was 3.8%.  40,718 people (73.6% of the population) lived in owner-occupied housing units and 14,158 people (25.6%) lived in rental housing units.

According to the 2010 United States Census, Fountain Valley had a median household income of $81,212, with 6.7% of the population living below the federal poverty line.

2000
According to the census of 2000, there were 54,978 people, 18,162 households, and 14,220 families residing in the city. The population density was 6,167.8 inhabitants per square mile (2,382.4/km2). The racial makeup of the city was 64.02% White, 1.11% Black or African American, 0.46% American Indian or Alaskan Native, 10.68% of the population were Hispanic or Latino of any race. 25.76% Asian, 0.40% Native Hawaiian or other Pacific Islander, 3.95% from other races, and 4.3% from two or more races.

There were 18,162 households, out of which 34.3% had children under the age of 18 living with them, 63.4% were married couples living together, 10.5% had a female householder with no husband present, and 21.7% were non-families. 16.0% of all households were made up of individuals, and 5.5% had someone living alone who was 65 years of age or older. The average household size was 3.00 and the average family size was 3.35.

In the city, the population was spread out, with 23.5% under the age of 18, 7.9% from 18 to 24, 30.1% from 25 to 44, 27.2% from 45 to 64, and 11.3% who were 65 years of age or older. The median age was 38 years. For every 100 females, there were 95.6 males. For every 100 females age 18 and over, there were 93.0 males.

The median income for a household in the city was $78,729, and the median income for a family was $90,335. Males had a median income of $60,399 versus $43,089 for females. The per capita income for the city was $48,521. About 1.6% of families and 2.3% of the population were below the poverty line, including 3.2% of those under age 18 and 3.0% of those age 65 or over.

Government

Politics
Fountain Valley is a reliably Republican stronghold in presidential elections; however, former Secretary of State Hillary Rodham Clinton won a plurality of the city in 2016, becoming the first Democrat in over four decades to carry the municipality.  However, in 2020, the city moved back into the Republican column, as Donald Trump carried the city with 51.0% of the vote, having made gains in Orange County's Vietnamese community.

According to the California Secretary of State, as of October 22, 2018, Fountain Valley has 32,884 registered voters. Of those, 12,935 (39.34%) are registered Republicans, 9,674 (29.42%) are registered Democrats, and 8,967 (27.27%) have declined to state a political party/are independents.

Notable people

 Summer Altice, model, actress, August 2000 Playboy Playmate of the Month.
 Nicholas Altobelli, musician.
 Rony Argueta, soccer player.
 Mary Astor, Academy Award for Best Supporting Actress; moved to Fountain Valley.
 Tara Lynne Barr, actress; raised in Fountain Valley.
 Jenny Benson, soccer player.
 Kenney Bertz, soccer player.
 Brian Brushwood, magician, podcaster, author, lecturer known for Scam School
 Roger H. Chen, businessman; moved to Fountain Valley.
 Don Clark, football player.
 Brandon Crouch, evangelist.
 Travis Denker, baseball player.
 Jack Evans, professional wrestler.
 Willie Eyre, baseball player.
 Amanda Freed, Olympic gold medal-winning softball player.
 Freddie Freeman, baseball player.
 K. J. Gerard, football player.
 Kim Gruenenfelder, writer, attended high school in Fountain Valley
 Ryan Hansen, actor.
 Carl Harry, football player.
 Mike Hessman, baseball player.
 Michael Hoyos, soccer player.
 Luke Hudson, baseball player: Kansas City Royals pitcher.
 Justin Huish, Olympic gold medalist.
 Casey Janssen, baseball player.
 Duy Khánh, musician; lived in Fountain Valley.
 Chay Lapin, Olympian.
 Wallace Rodecker, Los Caballeros Sports Club, Rodecker Companies.
 Ken Margerum, football player, Chicago Bears and San Francisco 49ers wide receiver, San Jose State college football assistant coach
 Dan McClintock, basketball player.
 Jerry M. Patterson, U.S. House of Representatives, California's 38th congressional district (1975–1985); Resident of Fountain Valley.
 Michelle Pfeiffer, actress, graduate of Fountain Valley High School Class of 1976
 Mike Pompeo, Los Amigos High School Grad (Class of 1982), US Secretary of State (2018–2021), Former Director of the Central Intelligence Agency (2017–18), Former Member of United States House of Representatives – Kansas 4th Congressional District (2011–2017)
 Isiah Robertson, NFL player, Los Angeles Rams; lived in Fountain Valley.
 Keri Russell, actress.
 Art Satherley, record producer.
 Nick Scandone, Paralympian.
 Aaron Schoenke, actor, screenwriter, director, editor, producer, cinematographer.
 M. Shadows, lead singer of Avenged Sevenfold
 David Sias, soccer player.
 Andre Sommersell, football player.
 Vai Taua, football player.
 Dale Thayer, baseball player.
 Chris Tillman, baseball player.
 Brian Van Holt, actor, graduate of Fountain Valley High School Class of 1987
 Craig Wilson, baseball player.
 C. J. Wilson, baseball player.
 Beau Wirick, actor.
 Chung Yong Taek, martial artist; lived in Fountain Valley.
 Tom McEwen, drag racer, lived in Fountain Valley.
 Laura Yeager, U.S. Army general, grew up in Fountain Valley.

References

External links

 
Cities in Orange County, California
Populated places on the Santa Ana River
Incorporated cities and towns in California
Populated places established in 1957
1957 establishments in California